Magh is the tenth month in Bikram Sambat or B.S., the official and Hindu religious calendar of the Nepalese speaking people native to the Indian subcontinent of Hindu Nepalese nationality and ethnic Hindu Nepalis of Indian nationality. This month approximately coincides with January 15 to February 12 of the Gregorian (western) calendar and is 29 days long.

Important holidays:
 Magh 1, Maghe Sankranti, also see Makar Sankranti
 Magh 9, Basant Panchami

Months in Nepali calendar

External links

Nepali calendar